Ashok Kumar Lahiri is an Indian economist and a member of the West Bengal Legislative Assembly from Balurghat. He is currently serving as a member of the FifteenthFinance Commission. Lahiri previously served as 12thChief Economic Adviser to the Government of India, reader at the Delhi School of Economics, chairman of Bandhan Bank, executive director at the Asian Development Bank and director of the National Institute of Public Finance and Policy and had stints with the World Bank and the International Monetary Fund, as a consultant and senior economist respectively. He is a member of the Bharatiya Janata Party.

Education 
Lahiri is an alumnus of the economics department of the Presidency University, Kolkata.

Economist 
Lahiri has served as Chief Economic Adviser to the Government of India, chairman of Bandhan Bank, economic adviser in the Ministry of Finance, executive director at the Asian Development Bank, director of the National Institute of Public Finance and Policy, reader at the Delhi School of Economics, consultant with the World Bank, and senior economist at the International Monetary Fund.

Director of the National Institute of Public Finance and Policy 
Lahiri served as the director of the National Institute of Public Finance and Policy for fouryears between February1998 and October2002.

Chief Economic Adviser 

Lahiri was appointed Chief Economic Adviser to the Government of India (CEA) by the prime minister-led Appointments Committee of the Cabinet in December2002, and demitted the office of CEA in June2007, serving in the Ministry of Finance for more than fouryears. Lahiri served as the CEA under the premiership of Atal Bihari Vajpayee and Manmohan Singh.

Chairman of Bandhan Bank 
Lahiri was appointed the non-executive, part-time chairman of the newly-formed Bandhan Bank in July2015; Lahiri resigned from his position as chairman in April2018 to serve as a full-time member of the FifteenthFinance Commission.

Member of the FifteenthFinance Commission 

Lahiri was appointed a part-time member of the FifteenthFinance Commission in November2017 by the President of India, Lahiri was elevated to a full-time member in April2018 and was accorded the status of a minister of state.

Politics 
He was declared as a candidate to contest from the Alipurduar constituency in the 2021 West Bengal election but due to animosity among the local BJP members in Alipurduar, his name was later withdrawn from Alipurduar constituency in the list of candidates. He was later declared as a candidate for the Balurghat constituency.

He won against TMC candidate Shekhar Dasgupta by securing 36,143 votes.

References 

Living people
Year of birth missing (living people)
Presidency University, Kolkata alumni
20th-century Indian economists
21st-century Indian economists
Chief Economic Advisers to the Government of India
Indian bankers
West Bengal MLAs 2021–2026
Bharatiya Janata Party politicians from West Bengal